This is a comprehensive discography of all releases put out by American hardcore and metal record label Black Market Activities.  Since October 2004, the label has had a distribution deal with Metal Blade Records.

Canceled releases

References

Discographies of American record labels
Heavy metal discographies